Chilly Pingal or Chilly Pingle (also Chilli Pingal) is a  tehsil of Doda district in the union territory of Jammu and Kashmir. The Headquarter of the Tehsil is Located at Tandla village.

Notes

References

Villages in Doda district
Doda district
Chenab Valley